Anton Nicolas de Souza (born July 26, 1974) is a Peruvian professional mixed martial artist and Brazilian Jiu-Jitsu black belt.

Biography and career
His style of fighting is a blend of freestyle wrestling and Brazilian jiu-jitsu. De Souza competed in wrestling throughout his high school and college years in Los Angeles. He learned Brazilian jiu jitsu under John Lewis and André Pederneiras. De Souza's trademark submission is a modified guillotine choke known as the Peruvian Necktie. C.B. Dollaway used this choke to defeat Jesse Taylor at UFC: Silva vs. Irvin.

He calls his style of fighting Cholitzu, which came about by fusing the words jiu jitsu and cholo, a term which generally refers to people with various amounts of Amerindian racial ancestry.

He appeared on The Ultimate Fighter 5, the fifth season of the Ultimate Fighting Championship produced reality television series The Ultimate Fighter. On the show, DeSouza was the wrestling coach of Team Penn, the team coached by BJ Penn. He coached next to BJ Penn. He managed to expand jiu-jitsu to Gray Maynard and Joe Lauzon.

To date, DeSouza has a professional mixed martial arts record of eleven wins and four losses. DeSouza lives in Cuzco, Peru.

Mixed martial arts record

|-
| Win
| align=center| 11–4
| Luis Perrogon
| Submission (rear naked choke)
| MMA Nemesis 1
| 
| align=center| 1
| align=center| 1:20
| La Paz, Bolivia
| 
|-
| Loss
| align=center| 10–4
| Roan Carneiro
| TKO (punches)
| UFC 79
| 
| align=center| 2
| align=center| 3:33
| Las Vegas, Nevada, United States
| 
|-
| Loss
| align=center| 10–3
| Thiago Alves
| KO (knee)
| UFC 66: Liddell vs. Ortiz
| 
| align=center| 2
| align=center| 1:10
| Las Vegas, Nevada, United States
| 
|-
| Win 
| align=center| 10–2
| Dustin Hazelett
| Submission (kimura)
| Ortiz vs. Shamrock 3: The Final Chapter
| 
| align=center| 1
| align=center| 3:59
| Hollywood, Florida, United States
| 
|-
| Win 
| align=center| 9–2
| Fabricio Monteiro
| Decision (majority)
| Gold Fighters Championship 1
| 
| align=center| 3
| align=center| 5:00
| Rio de Janeiro, Brazil
| 
|-
| Win 
| align=center| 8–2
| Vitelmo Kubis Bandeira
| Submission (kneebar)
| Jungle Fight 6
| 
| align=center| 1
| align=center| 4:38
| Manaus, Amazonas, Brazil
| 
|-
| Loss
| align=center| 7–2
| Angelo Diaz
| TKO (cut)
| South American Open
| 
| align=center| 1
| align=center| N/A
| Lima, Peru
| 
|-
| Win 
| align=center| 7–1
| Carlos Lima
| Submission (arm triangle choke)
| Jungle Fight 3
| 
| align=center| 2
| align=center| 0:32
| Manaus, Amazonas, Brazil
| 
|-
| Win 
| align=center| 6–1
| Luiz Azeredo
| Decision (split)
| Meca World Vale Tudo 11
| 
| align=center| 3
| align=center| 5:00
| Rio de Janeiro, Brazil
| 
|-
| Win 
| align=center| 5–1
| Chatt Lavender
| TKO (cut)
| World Fighting Alliance 1
| 
| align=center| 1
| align=center| 3:24
| Las Vegas, Nevada, United States
| 
|-
| Loss
| align=center| 4–1
| Jutaro Nakao
| KO (punch)
| UFC 33
| 
| align=center| 2
| align=center| 0:15
| Las Vegas, Nevada, United States
| 
|-
| Win 
| align=center| 4–0
| Paul Rodriguez
| Submission (guillotine choke)
| UFC 32
| 
| align=center| 1
| align=center| 1:05 
| Rutherford, New Jersey, United States
| 
|-
| Win
| align=center| 3–0
| Steve Berger
| Decision (unanimous)
| UFC 31 
| 
| align=center| 3
| align=center| 5:00
| Atlantic City, New Jersey, United States
| 
|-
| Win
| align=center| 2–0
| Kenneth Tanario
| Submission (toe hold)
| Gladiator Challenge 1
| 
| align=center| 1
| align=center| 0:56
| California, United States
| 
|-
| Win
| align=center| 1–0
| Ben Melendez
| TKO (Submission to strikes)
| CFF - The Cobra Classic 2000
| 
| align=center| 1
| align=center| 0:55
| Anza, California, United States
|

References

External links

A Sherdog interview with Tony DeSouza. Conducted in 2004

1974 births
Living people
Peruvian male mixed martial artists
Welterweight mixed martial artists
Mixed martial artists utilizing boxing
Mixed martial artists utilizing collegiate wrestling
Mixed martial artists utilizing freestyle wrestling
Mixed martial artists utilizing Brazilian jiu-jitsu
People awarded a black belt in Brazilian jiu-jitsu
Peruvian practitioners of Brazilian jiu-jitsu
Sportspeople from Lima
Ultimate Fighting Championship male fighters